The 2021–22 North Superleague (known as the McBookie.com North Superleague for sponsorship reasons) was the 20th season of the North Superleague, and the 1st season as the sixth tier of the Scottish football pyramid system. This is the top tier of league competition for SJFA North Region member clubs.

Banks O' Dee won the league title on 2 March 2022 thanks to a 4–0 win over Montrose Roselea at Spain Park, with five matches still to play. Banks O' Dee ultimately went on to complete an unbeaten season – the first such instance in the league's history – and set a record points tally, dropping four points during the campaign.

North Superleague

Stadia and locations

The North Superleague contains the same 14 clubs which competed in the 2019–20 season (which was declared null and void). There was no Superleague season in 2020–21.

League table

Results

North First Division
The North First Division contains the same 8 clubs which competed in the 2019–20 season (which was declared null and void). There was no First Division season in 2020–21.

League table

North Second Division

The North Second Division contains the same 8 clubs which competed in the 2019–20 season (which was declared null and void), minus Spey Valley United in abeyance during the pandemic, but with the addition of Rothie Rovers, competing in their first league campaign after being accepted to the league in July 2020. There was no Second Division season in 2020–21.

League table

Notes
 Club with an SFA Licence eligible to participate in the Highland League promotion play-off should they win the league.

References

External links

SJFA North Region Superleague seasons
6
Sco